The Savannah State Lady Tigers women's basketball team represents Savannah State University in women's basketball. The school competes in the Southern Intercollegiate Athletic Conference (SIAC) in Division II of the National Collegiate Athletic Association (NCAA). The Lady Tigers play home games at Tiger Arena in Savannah, Georgia.  The current head coach is Cedric Baker. Baker was named head coach on July 30, 2003.

On April 17, 2017, the school announced that it would return to Division II due to financial issues associated with competing in Division I. On December 7, 2017, the school announced it would rejoin Division II's Southern Intercollegiate Athletic Conference (SIAC) following the 2018–19 academic year, pending NCAA approval.

History
The Lady Tigers began play in 1928. They began Division II play in 1974, going 339-394 until they joined Division I in 2002. Since the 2002–03 season, they have a 148–260 record, with one appearance in the NCAA Tournament. They won 5 SEAC titles (1952, 1953, 1954, 1955, 1956) and one SIAC title (1976). They have played in the MEAC since 2011, and they currently have a 35-45 all-time conference record. Savannah State beat Coppin State 66–52, North Carolina A&T State 62-59 and Maryland Eastern Shore 65–47 to win the MEAC Tournament in 2015 to go to their first NCAA Tournament in school history. They were beaten 81–48 in the First Round by South Carolina. The Lady Tigers finished 21–11, the best record in their history since playing in Division I.

Postseason

NCAA Division I Tournament results
The Lady Tigers have appeared in the NCAA Division I women's basketball tournament one time. Their record is 0–1.

Season-by-season record

Team awards and NCAA records
Savannah State once held the NCAA Division I record for fewest points scored in a half (3 points) which occurred on November 23, 2003, against Florida State. That record has since been broken at least twice when 2 points were scored in a half, by Lipscomb against Western Kentucky on December 16, 2016, and by Ole Miss against South Carolina on January 30, 2020.
In 1995 the Lady Tigers led the nation in field-goal percentage defense (32.2%).
In 1984 the Lady Tigers led the nation in Average home game attendance (1,750 per game average).

References

External links